Rensi may refer to:
 Ed Rensi (born 1944),American businessman, CEO of McDonald's from 1991 to 1997
 Giuseppe Rensi, Italian 20th century philosopher (father of Emilia)
 Emilia Rensi, Italian 20th century philosopher (daughter of Giuseppe)
 Team Rensi Motorsports, a NASCAR team